The 2021 Channel One Trophy was a domestic figure skating competition held from February 5–7, 2021 in Moscow, Russia. Members of the 2021 Russian national team who placed in the top six at either the 2021 Russian Championships or the 2020 European Championships, or who'd previously won the World Championships in any of the four disciplines were invited to compete. Skaters competed against each other in two teams consisting of three men's single skaters, three ladies' single skaters, two pair teams, and three ice dance teams, randomly selected by team captains Evgenia Medvedeva and Alina Zagitova.

The competition was broadcast by Channel One Russia and was made available to international viewers via YouTube.

Scoring 
Skaters competed in both the short program/rhythm dance and the free skating/free dance segments for their team. Their individual scores for each program were added together to create a team total score.

Entries 
Channel One Russia announced the preliminary list of invitees on January 19, 2021.

Changes to preliminary entries

Teams

Results

Team

Men

Ladies

Pairs

Ice dance

References 

 2021 in figure skating
 2021 in Russian sport